Ireland–Russia relations are the bilateral foreign relations between the Republic of Ireland (EU member) and the Russian Federation (CIS member). Only Ireland is a member of the Council of Europe as of March 16 following the invasion of Ukraine and the Organization for Security and Co-operation in Europe. Ireland has an embassy in Moscow. The Russian Federation has an embassy in Dublin.

History

20th century
In June 1920, as part of the efforts by the Sinn Féin leadership to obtain international recognition of the Irish Republic, a "Draft Treaty between the new Russian Soviet Federative Socialist Republic and the Republic of Ireland" was circulated in Dublin. E. H. Carr, the historian of early Bolshevism, considered that ".. the negotiations were not taken very seriously on either side."

Patrick McCartan was to visit Moscow on the instructions of Éamon de Valera to make inquiries on the possibility of mutual recognition. However, before he proceeded "the Soviets had gone cold on ties with the Republic for fear of jeopardising trade negotiations with Britain."

In April 1920, Ireland provided a loan to the Soviet Union. Russian jewels were provided as security, and these jewels were secretly stored in a private suburban house in Dublin until 1938. The loan was repaid in 1948 and the jewels returned to Moscow.

The Republic of Ireland did not recognize the USSR until 29 September 1973.

Cooperation between both nations became much more active following the end of the Cold War, with many bilateral treaties coming into effect between both nations in numerous fields (taxation, investment protection, cultural and scientific, aviation, etc.).

21st century
On 1 February 2011, for the first time since 1983, the Irish government expelled a Russian diplomat based in Dublin after an investigation by the Garda Special Detective Unit (following a tip off from the United States Federal Bureau of Investigation) which found that the identities of six Irish citizens had been stolen and used as cover for Russian spies found to have been working in the United States in June 2010.

In 2015, the Russian embassy in Dublin received planning permission to erect new buildings on its  site. Included on the planning application was a large underground building ostensibly for storage and plant use. The Irish government held a special meeting in March 2020 to scrutinise the plans and after they were reinterpreted, building permission was revoked.

On 26 March 2018, the Irish government expelled another Russian diplomat. The Taoiseach Leo Varadkar described the expulsion as "an act of solidarity with the United Kingdom" following a nerve agent attack in Salisbury earlier that month.

In January 2022, Russia announced that it planned to conduct naval exercises within Ireland's exclusive economic zone but within international waters, approximately 240km off the coast of Cork. In response to a request from the Irish government, Russia's Minister of Defence Sergey Shoigu agreed to relocate these exercises on 29 January "as a gesture of goodwill".

On 24 February 2022, Irish Taoiseach Micheál Martin condemned Russia's invasion of Ukraine as an "immoral and outrageous breach of the most fundamental principles of international law" and a "shocking murderous act of aggression against a sovereign peaceful state", and promised that EU sanctions would be far reaching and hard-hitting. A painter also put red paint on some of the Russian embassy's walls. A few days later, a truck driver drove a truck into the Russian embassy and no one was killed or hurt.

After the Russian invasion of Ukraine started, Ireland, as one of the EU countries, imposed sanctions on Russia, and Russia added all EU countries to the list of "unfriendly nations".

As of April 2022, there were 31 Russian diplomats in Ireland.  On 16 November, 2022, the Russian Ministry of Foreign Affairs announced that Russia had sanctioned 52 Irish politicians "in response to the anti-Russian course of the Irish government".

See also 
Foreign relations of Ireland 
Foreign relations of Russia
Ireland–NATO relations
List of ambassadors of Russia to Ireland

References

External links

 Embassy of Ireland in Moscow
 Embassy of Russia in Dublin 

 
Russia
Bilateral relations of Russia